Preyasi Raave  is a 1999 Telugu language film directed by Chandra Mahesh and produced by D. Ramanaidu. The film stars  Srikanth, Raasi, Babloo Prithiveeraj and Sanghavi. The film was a blockbuster.

Cast

 Srikanth as Vamsi
 Raasi as Mahalakshmi
 Babloo Prithiveeraj as Sriram, Mahalakshmi's husband
 Sanghavi as Soni Maganti
 Brahmanandam as Dr. Gopal MS
 Ali as Ali, Vamsi's friend
 Chalapathi Rao as Mahalakshmi's father
 Annapurna as Mahalakshmi's mother
 M. S. Narayana as Dr. Appa Rao
 AVS as Dr. Janardan
 Srihari as AV Rao, Sriram's step-brother
 Rama Prabha as Anasuya, Gopal's aunt
 Sivaji Raja as Vamsi's brother-in-law
 Ramjagan
 Shanoor Sana as Pavani, Vamsi's sister
 Raghunatha Reddy as Sriram's father
 Dharmavarapu Subramanyam as Doctor
 Nagendra Babu as Doctor
 Delhi Rajeshwari as Nagendra Babu's wife (Cameo appearance)
 D. Ramanaidu as Mr. Naidu, Vamsi's boss
 Master Ananda Vardhan as Nani, Vamsi's nephew
 Rajitha as Anasuya's daughter
 Gundu Hanumantha Rao as a patient

Production
During the making of the film, D. Ramanaidu told Srikanth to change his hairstyle but he did not follow suit.

Soundtrack
The music was composed by M. M. Srilekha.

References

External links
 

1999 films
1990s Telugu-language films
Suresh Productions films
Films scored by M. M. Srilekha